Thoreson is a surname. Notable people with the surname include:

Blair Thoreson (born 1964), American politician
Jennifer Thoreson (born 1979), American visual artist and photographer
Simon Thoreson (1849–1918), American politician
Steve Thoreson, American tenor singer